Events from the year 1910 in Canada.

Incumbents

Crown 
 Monarch – Edward VII (until May 6) then George V

Federal government 
 Governor General – Albert Grey, 4th Earl Grey 
 Prime Minister – Wilfrid Laurier
 Chief Justice – Charles Fitzpatrick (Quebec) 
 Parliament – 11th

Provincial governments

Lieutenant governors 
Lieutenant Governor of Alberta – George Hedley Vicars Bulyea 
Lieutenant Governor of British Columbia – Thomas Wilson Paterson  
Lieutenant Governor of Manitoba – Daniel Hunter McMillan
Lieutenant Governor of New Brunswick – Lemuel John Tweedie 
Lieutenant Governor of Nova Scotia – Duncan Cameron Fraser (until September 27) then James Drummond McGregor
Lieutenant Governor of Ontario – John Morison Gibson  
Lieutenant Governor of Prince Edward Island – Donald Alexander MacKinnon (until June 1) then Benjamin Rogers 
Lieutenant Governor of Quebec – Charles Alphonse Pantaléon Pelletier 
Lieutenant Governor of Saskatchewan – Amédée Forget (until October 5) then George William Brown

Premiers 
Premier of Alberta – Alexander Cameron Rutherford (until May 26) then Arthur Sifton   
Premier of British Columbia – Richard McBride  
Premier of Manitoba – Rodmond Roblin  
Premier of New Brunswick – John Douglas Hazen
Premier of Nova Scotia – George Henry Murray 
Premier of Ontario – James Whitney   
Premier of Prince Edward Island – Francis Haszard   
Premier of Quebec – Lomer Gouin  
Premier of Saskatchewan – Thomas Walter Scott

Territorial governments

Commissioners
 Commissioner of Yukon – Alexander Henderson 
 Gold Commissioner of Yukon – F.X. Gosselin 
 Commissioner of Northwest Territories – Frederick D. White

Events
January 3  – Happiness and contentment are found from one end of Canada to the other – headline in The Times (page 5)
January 10 – The Laurier government introduces the Naval Service Act creating a Canadian navy to great controversy.  The bill would end up alienating most of Laurier supporters and lead to his defeat in the 1911 election.
January 10 – Le Devoir first published
January 21 – A Canadian Pacific Railway passenger train derails and crashes into a bridge over the Spanish River near Nairn in Sudbury District, Ontario. Between 43 and 70 people are killed in what was at the time the worst disaster in Canadian Pacific history, and one of  the worst railway disasters in Canadian history.
March 5 – 65 railway maintenance workers, over half of them Japanese, are killed in an avalanche at Rogers Pass, British Columbia while trying to clear the Canadian Pacific Railway's transcontinental mainline. It is the worst disaster in Canadian Pacific history.
May 4 – The Royal Canadian Navy is created after the Naval Service Act passes
May 6 – Edward VII dies and is succeeded by George V
May 26 – Arthur Sifton becomes premier of Alberta, replacing Alexander Rutherford
July 31 – British murderer Dr. Crippen is caught in Quebec City
December 9 – a coal mine explosion at Bellevue, Alberta, kills 31

Sport 
January 5/7 – Ottawa HC defeats Galt HC 15 goals to 4 to win the first Stanley Cup challenge in Ottawa's Dey's Arena
January 18/20 – Ottawa HC defeats Edmonton HC 21 goals to 11 to win the second Stanley Cup challenge in Ottawa's Dey's Arena
March 12 – Montreal Wanderers defeat Berlin Dutchmen 7 goals to 3 to win the final Stanley Cup challenge in Montreal's Jubilee Rink
September 13 – Regina Rugby Club (Saskatchewan Roughriders) are established
November 26 – The University of Toronto Varsity Blues defeat the Hamilton Tigers 16 to 7 to win the 2nd Grey Cup, played at Hamilton's A.A.A. Grounds

Arts and literature

New Books
Anne of Avonlea – Lucy Maud Montgomery
Ednyfed Fychan – William Williams
Practical Political Economy – Stephen Leacock

Births

January to June
January 4 – Arthur Villeneuve, painter (d. 1990)
February 2 – Andrew McKeller, astrophysicist 
February 5 – Charles Philippe Leblond, pioneer of cell biology and stem cell research (d. 2007)
February 27 – Robert Bryce, civil servant (d. 1997)
May 4 – Arsène Gagné, Quebec politician (d. 1964)
May 30 – Keir Clark, Prince Edward Island politician (d. 2010)
June 17 – George Hees, politician and minister (d. 1996)
June 26 – Munroe Bourne, swimmer (d. 1992)

July to December

July 2 – Lorne Carr, hockey player (d. 2007)
July 17 – James Coyne, second Governor of the Bank of Canada
July 19 – Jean Wilson, speed-skater 
July 29 – Norman Fawcett, politician (d. 1997)
August 13 – Gwendolyn Ringwood, playwright
August 18 – Robert Winters, politician and businessman (d. 1969)
August 26 – Jessie Gray, surgeon (d. 1978)
September 10 – Harry Thode, geochemist, nuclear chemist and academic administrator (d. 1997)
September 21 – Anne Wilkinson, poet (d. 1961)
October 8 – Ray Lewis, track and field athlete, Olympic bronze medallist, first Canadian-born black Olympic medallist (d. 2003)
October 13 – Otto Joachim, German-born composer (d. 2010)
October 21 – Pauline Mills McGibbon, politician and 22nd Lieutenant-Governor of Ontario (d. 2001)
 October 27 – Jack Carson, actor (d. 1963)
November 14 – Michael Starr, politician and first Canadian cabinet minister of Ukrainian descent (d. 2000)

Full date unknown
James Cameron, writer
Al Clouston, storyteller, humourist and author (d. 2004)
Leo Landreville, politician and judge implicated in the Northern Ontario Natural Gas scandal (d. 1996)

Deaths
February 2 – George Murdoch, politician and 1st mayor of Calgary (b.1850)
February 9 – George Barnard Baker, lawyer, politician and Senator (b.1834)
February 15 – Joseph-Élisée Beaudet, businessman and politician (b.1834)
February 26 – Adelaide Hoodless, educational reformer who founded the Women's Institute (b.1857)
May 6 – Edward VII, King of Canada (b.1841)
June 7 – Goldwin Smith, historian and journalist (b.1823)
June 9 – Charles Braithwaite, politician and agrarian leader (b.1850)
September 2 – Hector Fabre, lawyer, journalist, diplomat and senator (b.1834)

Historical documents
Prime Minister Laurier says creating navy is necessary for autonomous nation

Poster: Canadian Pacific steamship fleets

At Eucharistic Congress of Montreal, Henri Bourassa defends use of French in Catholic worship

Instructions to Cowichan Indian Agency include discouraging "foolish, wasteful and demoralizing" potlatches

Grain Growers' Guide reports "tricks" and "graft" Prairie farmers encounter at grain elevators

Socialist Party leaflet quotes Alberta MLA championing railway workers

Rudyard Kipling urges people of Medicine Hat not to change city's name

Lucy Maud Montgomery answers questions about Boston, women's suffrage, and Prince Edward Island

Cartoon: Angry women chase Toronto mayor saying "Wonder who told them we didn't encourage the suffragette movement in Toronto?"

References 

 
Years of the 20th century in Canada
Canada
Canada